Archie Ryan (born 16 November 2001) is an Irish professional racing cyclist, who currently rides for UCI Continental team .

Major results

2018
 3rd Overall Junior Tour of Wales
1st Stage 4
2019
 National Junior Road Championships
2nd Road race
2nd Time trial
 6th Overall Bizkaiko Itzuli
2020
 7th Overall Bałtyk–Karkonosze Tour
 8th Overall Ronde de l'Isard
2022
 4th Overall Tour de l'Avenir
 6th Overall Okolo Slovenska
1st  Young rider classification
1st Stage 2
 6th Overall Sazka Tour
 7th Overall Istrian Spring Trophy
 7th G.P. Palio del Recioto
 8th Overall Ronde de l'Isard
1st Stage 5

References

External links
 

2001 births
Living people
Irish male cyclists